A sanna is a spongy, steamed, and savoury  unfilled dumpling originally made of red rice, black lentil & coconut in the Konkan region, by the western coast of the Indian subcontinent. They are originated in Goa and Damaon, Mangalore, Bombay & Bassein (Vasai), they are especially popular among Goans, both the Goan Hindus and Goan Christians, also among the Konkani migrants outside Konkan in Karachi, Sindh, Gujarat, Karnataka & Kerala. Also by the people of Konkan division, such as the Kuparis of the Bombay East Indian community.

Hindus normally use urad dal, coconut water & coconut milk for fermentation. Catholic sannas consist of two types: Those made from the toddy of coconut flowers, and those sannas made using the sap-toddy of the coconut palm. Though both of them require the same varieties of rice, sannas are commonly made with coconut for fermentation, unlike idlis that are commonly made by adding yeast. They are made on special days such as Ganesh Chaturthi, Sonsar Padvo/ Yugadi and Makar Sankranti, Catholics generally prepare them for church feasts, christenings and weddings. Sometimes a sweet version is made with jaggery, known as godachi sanna. 

Mangalorean Catholic cuisine on special days is incomplete without sannas. They are a much-loved and served with bafat, a spicy pork curry prepared with a medley of powdered spices. Sannas are also served alongside chicken or mutton curries, and also with beef before the beef ban in India. They can be eaten for breakfast with coconut chutney or saambhar, or with coconut milk sweetened with jaggery and flavoured with cardamom.

In the present-day, the inavailability or ban of toddy in certain places; and the difficult and lengthy process of extracting fresh coconut milk; has made the dish a occasional delicacy, prepared during Konkani celebrations only. Sometimes the dish completely substituted by idlis, made of white rice and yeast based batter.

See also
Feni (Goa)
Bombay Sapphire
 List of steamed foods
 List of fermented foods

Citations

External links
Sanna Recipe
Recipe 1
Recipe 2

Indian cuisine
Goan cuisine
Konkani cuisine
Indian breads
Culture of Mumbai
Mangalorean cuisine
Steamed foods